Ascania may refer to:

 House of Ascania, a German noble family who ruled the Duchy of Anhalt in Saxony and other territories, including Saxony and Brandenburg
 , an island in the Cyclades near Santorini
 Lake Ascania by Nicaea, now known as Lake İznik in Bursa Province, Turkey
 Askania-Nova, a biosphere reserve in Kherson Oblast, Ukraine
 RMS Ascania (1911), originally laid down as the Gerona for the Thomson Line in 1911, wrecked off Newfoundland on 13 June 1918
 RMS Ascania (1923), a Cunard liner that became the armed merchant cruiser HMS Ascania in World War II.